Ask is the active verb for a direct question.

Ask may also refer to:

Places
 Ask, Akershus, a village in Gjerdrum municipality, Viken county, Norway
 Ask, Buskerud, a village in Ringerike municipality, Viken county, Norway
 Ask, Vestland, a village in Askøy municipality, Vestland county, Norway
 Ask, Iran, a village in Mazandaran Province

People
 Ask la Cour, Danish ballet dancer
 Beatrice Ask (born 1956), Swedish politician
 Morten Ask (born 1980), Norwegian ice hockey player

Other
 Ask (horse), a British Thoroughbred race horse
 "Ask" (song), a 1986 song by The Smiths
 Ask and Embla, in Norse mythology
 Ask price, in economics
 Ask.com, a web search engine, formerly Ask Jeeves
 Ask.fm, a social Q&A web site
 "Ask", a song by Avail from Over the James

See also
ASK (disambiguation)